INSAM Institute for Contemporary Artistic Music is Bosnian/international institute for interdisciplinary and transdisciplinary research in contemporary music and new artistic paradigms. It is based in Sarajevo (Bosnia and Herzegovina). It is the only institute for contemporary music and art research in Bosnia and Herzegovina. INSAM Institute was founded in January, 2015.

Purpose
INSAM Institute works on art and scientific research, publishing musical scores and scientific work, organizing concerts, performances, exhibitions, competitions, lectures and masterclasses, and supports projects of young artists and transdisciplinary researchers.

Departments
INSAM Institute consists of seven departments:

 Composition
 INSAM Sound Lab
 Musical Robots Research Lab
 Instrumental Interpretation
 Research in Music, Art Theory / Transdisciplinary Research in Art
 Archive
 INSAM Visionary Platform

INSAM Journal of Contemporary Music, Art and Technology
INSAM Journal of Contemporary Music, Art and Technology is an international peer reviewed journal dealing with topical issues in contemporary art music, visual and performing arts, and technology. The Journal is issued semi-annually (in July and December) in open access electronic form. INSAM Journal is indexed in CEEOL – Central and Eastern European Online Library and RILM – Répertoire International de Littérature Musicale

The Editor-in-Chief is Bojana Radovanović
Notable contributors include:Miško Šuvaković, Ališer Sijarić, Roman Yampolskiy, Gennady Stolyarov II, Zoltan Istvan, Hanan Hadžajlić, Luba Elliott, Milan Milojković, Andreja Andrić, Daniel Becker, Asher Tobin Chodos.

Members and advisors
INSAM Institute has more than 60 members and advisors from Bosnia and Herzegovina, Serbia, Croatia, Montenegro, Slovenia, Ireland, Germany, Denmark, Switzerland, France, United States, Australia.

References

Contemporary music organizations
Arts in Bosnia and Herzegovina
Bosnia and Herzegovina music
Music organizations based in Bosnia and Herzegovina
International music organizations